The Man in the Iron Mask is a 1998 American action drama film written, directed, and produced by Randall Wallace. It stars Leonardo DiCaprio in a dual role as the title character and the villain, Jeremy Irons as Aramis, John Malkovich as Athos, Gérard Depardieu as Porthos, and Gabriel Byrne as D'Artagnan. Some characters are from Alexandre Dumas's D'Artagnan Romances and some plot elements are very loosely adapted from his 1847-1850 novel The Vicomte de Bragelonne.

The film centers on the aging four musketeers, Athos, Porthos, Aramis, and D'Artagnan, during the reign of King Louis XIV. It explores the mystery of the Man in the Iron Mask, with a plot closer to the flamboyant 1929 version starring Douglas Fairbanks, The Iron Mask, and the 1939 version, directed by James Whale, than to the original Dumas book. The film received mixed reviews but was a financial success, grossing $183 million worldwide against a budget of $35 million.

Plot 

In 1662, the Kingdom of France faces bankruptcy from King Louis XIV's wars against the Dutch, which has left the country's agriculture impeded by a heavy tax burden and forced the citizens to live on rotten food. Though the country appears to be on the verge of a revolution, Louis continues to spend his time preparing for war and seducing countless women. The three musketeers have gone their separate ways; Aramis is now an aging priest, Porthos has become a philandering drunk, and Athos is retired and living with his only son, Raoul, who aspires to join the Musketeers. Only D'Artagnan has remained with the Musketeers, now serving as their Captain.
 
At a festival, Aramis learns that the Jesuit order has declared Louis's wars unjust and the source of public hunger and outrage. Louis personally instructs Aramis to secretly hunt down and kill the Jesuit leader. Also in attendance are Raoul and his fiancée, Christine Bellefort. Louis immediately sets his sights on Christine, but, faithful to Raoul, she resists his affections. A Jesuit assassin attempts to kill Louis, but is killed by D'Artagnan instead. Louis immediately plots to seduce Christine by having Raoul sent to the battlefront. D'Artagnan visits Athos to warn him of the danger Raoul faces. But then Raoul arrives and informs his father he has been recalled to his regiment because he believes Louis desires Christine. Raoul nevertheless resolves to go because he will not risk making Christine a widow nor consider himself a coward. Athos angrily warns D'Artagnan that if Raoul is harmed, then Louis will become his enemy. He states D'Artagnan doesn't understand fatherhood. D'Artagnan tells Athos he will personally speak to Louis about Raoul.
 
An angry crowd from Paris attacks the Musketeers when they are fed rotten food, but D'Artagnan calms the crowd and says he will personally speak to Louis about public hunger. Louis assures D'Artagnan he will deal with the matter, and that Raoul will return soon from the war. Instead, Louis orders his chief adviser executed for distributing the rotten food (which Louis earlier ordered him to distribute), and orders that all rioters are to be shot from now on. Raoul joins the war and is killed at the battlefront by cannon fire. Upon learning of his son's death, Athos attempts to kill Louis but is stopped by D'Artagnan, and goes into exile. Louis invites Christine to the royal palace and coerces her into sex by promising to have his personal doctor treat her sick mother and sister and has them sent to recover at his country estate.
 
Aramis summons Porthos, Athos and D'Artagnan for a secret meeting in which he reveals that he himself is the Jesuits' leader and has a plan to depose Louis. Athos and Porthos agree, but D'Artagnan refuses to cooperate because his oath of honor cannot be removed or betrayed. Athos angrily confronts D'Artagnan over his devotion and loyalty to Louis, but D'Artagnan still refuses to join their plot. Athos brands him a traitor and threatens him with death should they ever meet again.
 
The three musketeers enter a remote prison and smuggle out an unnamed prisoner in an iron mask, taking him to the countryside, where Aramis reveals that he is Philippe, Louis's identical twin brother. Aramis reveals that the night Louis was born, his mother, Queen Anne, gave birth to twins. Louis XIII, hoping to avoid dynastic warfare between his sons, sent Philippe away to live in the countryside with no knowledge of his true identity. On his deathbed, Louis XIII revealed Philippe's existence to Anne and Louis. Anne, having been told by her priest that Philippe had died at birth, then wished to restore Philippe's birthright. But Louis, now king and too superstitious to have his brother killed, had Philippe imprisoned instead in the iron mask to keep his identity secret, something Aramis reluctantly carried out. Aramis's plan is now to redeem himself and save France by replacing Louis with Philippe. The musketeers begin training Philippe to act and behave like Louis, while Athos develops fatherly feelings for him.
 
At a masquerade ball, the musketeers lure Louis to his quarters and subdue him, dressing Philippe in his clothes while taking Louis to the dungeons. D'Artagnan uncovers the ruse, after Christine accuses Philippe with evidence of Louis's role in Raoul's death and is not rebuffed. He forcibly escorts Philippe to the dungeons and they confront the musketeers before they can take Louis to the Bastille. They trade twins, but Philippe is captured before the musketeers escape. D'Artagnan is shocked to learn who Philippe is and begs Louis not to kill him, as does Anne. Louis refuses, but Philippe pleads with Louis to kill him rather than put him back in the mask, which convinces Louis decides to send Philippe to the Bastille and have the mask placed on him again, cynically stating Philippe will wear the mask until he loves it. He orders D'Artagnan to bring him the severed heads of Athos, Porthos and Aramis or Louis will have his head. Meanwhile, Christine commits suicide by hanging herself outside Louis's bedroom window out of grief and remorse.
 
D'Artagnan contacts his friends for help in rescuing Philippe from the Bastille. Louis, who suspected D'Artagnan would help his friends, ambushes them at the prison. Though he offers D'Artagnan clemency in exchange for surrender, D'Artagnan refuses, privately revealing to Philippe and his friends that Louis and Philippe are actually his sons from an affair with the Queen. He also reveals he never knew Philippe existed, and never felt pride as a father until now. They charge one final time at Louis and his men and are fired upon; their bravery compels the soldiers to close their eyes before firing and all miss. Louis attempts to stab Philippe but wounds D'Artagnan fatally and he dies in his friends' arms. Philippe attacks Louis but stops when D'Artagnan reminds him that Louis is his brother. Athos asks D'Artagnan's forgiveness realizing D'Artagnan's loyalty to Louis was out of fatherly devotion to his son, the same fatherly devotion Athos had to his son Raoul.
 
D'Artagnan's top lieutenant, Andre, angered by his mentor's death, swears his men to secrecy and orders them out of the prison, siding with Philippe. They switch the twins' places again and Philippe orders Louis locked away, placing the iron mask in his head, and then names Athos, Porthos and Aramis as his royal counsel. A small funeral is held for D'Artagnan and Philippe admits to Athos that he has come to love him like a father, which Athos reciprocates. Philippe later issues Louis a royal pardon and sends him to live peacefully in the countryside, and goes on to become one of France's greatest kings. The tombstone of D'Artagnan has an iron mask imprint chiseled upon it by his friends, saying that due to his secret, he was the real man in the iron mask.

Cast
 Leonardo DiCaprio as Philippe Bourbon/King Louis XIV
 Jeremy Irons as Aramis and Narrator
 John Malkovich as Athos
 Gérard Depardieu as Porthos
 Gabriel Byrne as D'Artagnan 
 Anne Parillaud as Queen Anne of Austria
 Judith Godrèche as Christine Bellefort
 Peter Sarsgaard as Raoul, son of Athos
 Edward Atterton as Lieutenant Andre, D'Artagnan's second in command
 Hugh Laurie as Pierre, Advisor to King Louis XIV
 David Lowe as Advisor to King Louis XIV

Production
In this version, the "man in the iron mask" is introduced as prisoner number 64389000 based on the number related to his namesake found at the Bastille. The Château de Vaux-le-Vicomte acts as the primary residence of the king as Versailles was still early in its construction and years away from Louis establishing residence there.

Reception

Box office
The film grossed $17 million on its opening weekend in second place behind Titanic, another film starring Leonardo DiCaprio. It eventually grossed $56 million at the domestic box office, and $126 million in international receipts, for a total of $183 million worldwide.

Critical response
On Rotten Tomatoes, the film has an approval rating of 32% with an average rating of 5.5/10, based on 41 reviews. The site's critical consensus states, "Leonardo DiCaprio plays dual roles with diminishing returns in The Man in the Iron Mask, a cheesy rendition of the Musketeers' epilogue that bears all the pageantry of Alexandre Dumas' text, but none of its romantic panache." On Metacritic, it has a score of 48 out of 100 based on 18 reviews, indicating "mixed or average reviews". Audiences polled by CinemaScore gave the film an average grade of "B+" on an A+ to F scale.

Roger Ebert of the Chicago Sun-Times gave it 2.5 out of 4. Kenneth Turan of the Los Angeles Times wrote that while the "production values are not lacking", "Wallace, in his first try at directing, has been unable to unify the film’s disparate elements. There’s swordplay and tragedy, slapstick and romance, lots of DiCaprio for all those teenage girls--there’s everything but a consistent style. And events are handled so broadly it’s not surprising to learn that the director’s inspiration was the Classics Illustrated version of the Dumas novel he read as a youth."

Accolades
The film was nominated for the Best Original Score for an Adventure Film by the International Film Music Critics Award (IFMCA).

Depardieu was nominated for the European Film Academy Achievement in World Cinema Award for his role as Porthos. DiCaprio won a Golden Raspberry Award for Worst Screen Couple for his interactions as twins.

Soundtrack

The soundtrack was written by the English composer Nick Glennie-Smith.

References

External links

 
 
 

1998 films
1998 action drama films
1990s action adventure films
1990s adventure drama films
1990s prison drama films
Adultery in films
American action adventure films
American action drama films
American adventure drama films
1990s English-language films
Films about royalty
Films about twin brothers
Films based on The Vicomte of Bragelonne: Ten Years Later
Films directed by Randall Wallace
Films scored by Nick Glennie-Smith
Films shot in France
American swashbuckler films
United Artists films
Works about Louis XIV
Metro-Goldwyn-Mayer films
1998 directorial debut films
1998 drama films
Man in the Iron Mask
Twins in fiction
Golden Raspberry Award winning films
1990s American films